The Giro d'Italia automobilistico was an automobile race around Italy, historically first held in 1901, then reinstituted as annual event between 1973 and 1980, resurrected for 1988 and 1989, and again in 2011. Both in its historical and modern iterations the Giro d'Italia was inspired by its French equivalent, the Tour de France Automobile.

History

1901
The first Giro d'Italia was organised by Club automobilistico di Torino (Automobile club of Turin) with the patronage of Milanese newspaper Il Corriere della Sera. Seventy-two crews enrolled.

The race started on 27 April 1901 in Turin; of the 72 cars which had enrolled, only 32 were present at the starting line. These included nine Fiats, four Panhards, four Peugeots, three Renaults, two Rossellis, two Morses, and one each from Benz, Ceirano, Delahaye, Marchand, Daimler, De Dion, Isotta Fraschini and Darracq.

1934
Carlo Pintacuda and Mario Nardilli won in a Lancia Astura.

1954
Luigi Taramazzo and Gerino Gerini won in an Alfa Romeo 1900 SS.

1973

The first Giro d'Italia automobilistico took place between 24 and 28 October. The race was part of the Italian Group 4 Championship.

{|class="wikitable" style="font-size:90%;" width=650px
|+ Route and events
!width=100px| Day
!width=250px| Leg
!width=200px| Circuit or route
!width=100px| Event
|-
|rowspan=2| 25 October
|rowspan=2| Turin–Varano de' Melegari || Cesana–Sestriere || Hillclimb
|-
| Autodromo di Casale || Circuit race
|-
|rowspan=4| 26 October
|rowspan=4| Varano de' Melegari–Misano Adriatico || Autodromo di Varano || Time trial
|-
| Autodromo del Mugello || Circuit race
|-
| Autodromo Dino Ferrari || Circuit race
|-
| Autodromo di Misano || Night time trial
|-
|rowspan=3| 27 October
|rowspan=3| Misano Adriatico–Turin || Autodromo di Misano || Circuit race
|-
| Autodromo di Varano || Circuit race
|-
| Autodromo di Casale || Night time trial
|}

{| class="wikitable" style="font-size:90%;" width=500px
|- bgcolor="#efefef"
|+ Podium finishers
|-
!width=5%| Rank
!width=25%| Drivers
!width=40%| TeamCar
!width=10%| Class
!width=20%| Time
|-
|align=center|1
|  ||  Scuderia Nettuno De Tomaso Pantera Gr.4 ||align=center| Gr. 4 || 55 m 35.0 s
|-
|align=center|2
|  ||  Bonomelli Squadra Corse Porsche 911 ||align=center| Gr. 5 || 57 m 11.2 s
|-
|align=center|3
|  ||  Brescia Corse Porsche 911 ||align=center| Gr. 5 || 59 m 57.3 s
|}

{| class="wikitable" style="font-size:90%;" width=500px
|- bgcolor="#efefef"
|+ Class winners
|-
!width=10%| Class
!width=25%| Drivers
!width=40%| Car
!width=20%| Time
|-
!colspan=4 align=center|Group 5
|-
| >1300 cc
| Bonomelli-Bonomelli || Porsche 911 || 57 m 11.2 s
|-
!colspan=4 align=center|Group 4
|-
| >2000 cc
| Casoni-Minganti || De Tomaso Pantera Gr.4 || 55 m 35.0 s
|-
| 2000 cc
| Dal Ben-Besenzoni || Fiat 124 S || 1 h 08 m 47.8 s
|-
| 1600 cc
| Mussa-Martino || Alfa Romeo Giulia GTA || 1 h 05 m 53.8 s
|-
| 1300 cc
| Artina-Librizzi || Alpine Renault 1300 S || 1 h 22 m 05.3 s
|-
|}

1974
The 2º Giro d'Italia automobilistico took place between 14 and 20 October. The race was part of the Italian Group 4 Championship.

The works Fiat Rally team fielded four cars: two Fiat Abarth X1/9 prototypes (one driven by Ferrari F1 pilot Clay Regazzoni), a mysterious Abarth SE 030 prototype based on the yet unveiled Lancia Montecarlo (which scored a remarkable second place on its first outing), and finally a Group 4 124 Abarth Rally.
Lancia was only represented by the Andruet/Biche's victorious Lancia Stratos Turbo.
Another notable entrant was Arturo Merzario, on an ill-prepared Jolly Club Group 5 Stratos, stopped by an engine seizure already on the first day, at Casale.
Of 85 on the starting grid, 52 finished the race.

{|class="wikitable"  style="font-size:90%;"
|+ Route and events
!width=100px| Day
!width=250px| Leg
!width=200px| Circuit or route
!width=100px| Event
|-
|rowspan=2| 15 October
|rowspan=2| Turin–Imola || Cesana–Sestriere || Hillclimb
|-
| Autodromo di Casale || Race
|-
|rowspan=2| 16 October
|rowspan=2| Imola–Misano Adriatico || Autodromo Dino Ferrari || Race
|-
| Autodromo del Mugello || Race
|-
|rowspan=3| 17 October
|rowspan=3| Misano Adriatico–Vallelunga || Autodromo di Misano || Race
|-
| S. Stefano–Passo dello Spino || Hillclimb
|-
| Autodromo di Magione || Race
|-
|rowspan=3| 18 October
|rowspan=3| Vallelunga–Parma || Autodromo di Vallelunga || Race
|-
| S. Giorgio–Colonnetta || Hillclimb
|-
| Quercegrossa–Croce Fiorentina || Hillclimb
|-
|rowspan=2| 19 October
|rowspan=2| Parma–Turin || Autodromo di Varano || Race
|-
| Autodromo di Monza || Race
|}

{| class="wikitable" style="font-size:90%;"
|- bgcolor="#efefef"
|+ Podium finishers
|-
!width=30px| Rank
!width=100px| Drivers
!width=200px| TeamCar
!width=30px| Class
!width=125px| Time
|-
|align=center|1
|  ||  Lancia Corse Lancia Stratos Turbo ||align=center| Gr. 5 || 1 h 18 m 41.5 s
|-
|align=center|2
|  ||  Abarth Abarth SE 030 ||align=center| Gr. 5 || 1 h 22 m 43.4 s
|-
|align=center|3
|  ||  Scuderia Nettuno De Tomaso Pantera Gr.4 ||align=center| Gr. 4 || 1 h 24 m 10.5 s
|}

1975

The 3º Giro d'Italia automobilistico took place between 11 and 18 October.
For 1975 the coefficient for hillclimb races times was raised to 3:1, thus favouring rally drivers over circuit drivers, less accustomed to racing on closed public roads; no Formula One drivers took parts to the 3rd Giro. Autodelta fielded an Alfa Romeo 33/3 in Group 5.
The favourite Munari/Maiga duo ended sixth, but only after having witnessed their Alitalia Stratos Turbo burn to the ground after the last race. Winner were Pianta and Scabini on a 3.5-litre Abarth SE 031, a prototype based on a heavily modified Fiat 131.

{|class="wikitable"  style="font-size:90%;" width=730px
!width=100px| Day
!width=250px| Leg
!width=200px| Circuit or route
!width=100px| Event
!width= 80px| Notes
|-
|rowspan=2| 12 October
|rowspan=2| Turin–Modena || Autodromo di Monza || Race ||
|-
| Cesana–Sestriere || Hillclimb || Race cancelled
|-
|rowspan=2| 13 October
|rowspan=2| Modena–Misano Adriatico || Autodromo Dino Ferrari || Race ||
|-
| Autodromo di Misano || Race ||
|-
|rowspan=2| 14 October
|rowspan=2| Misano Adriatico–Magione || S. Stefano–Passo dello Spino || Hillclimb ||
|-
| Autodromo di Magione || Race ||
|-
|rowspan=2| 15 October
|rowspan=2| Magione–Orvieto || Rieti–Terminillo || Hillclimb ||
|-
| Autodromo di Vallelunga || Race ||
|-
|rowspan=3| 16 October
|rowspan=3| Orvieto–Parma || S. Giorgio–Colonnetta || Hillclimb ||
|-
| Quercegrossa–Croce Fiorentina|| Hillclimb || Race cancelled
|-
| Autodromo del Mugello || Race ||
|-
|rowspan=2| 17 October
|rowspan=2| Parma–Turin || Autodromo di Varano || Race ||
|-
| Autodromo di Casale || Race ||
|-
|colspan=5| Sources:
|}

{| class="wikitable" style="font-size:90%;" width=500px
|- bgcolor="#efefef"
!colspan=5| Podium finishers
|-
!width=5%| Rank
!width=25%| Drivers
!width=40%| TeamCar
!width=10%| Class
!width=20%| Time
|-
|align=center|1
|  ||  Abarth Abarth SE 031 ||align=center| Gr. 5 || 1 h 24 m 09.9 s
|-
|align=center|2
|  ||  Scuderia Nord Ovest Porsche 911 Carrera RSR ||align=center| Gr. 4 || 1 h 24 m 20.9 s
|-
|align=center|3
|  ||  Scuderia Nettuno Porsche 3000 ||align=center| Gr. 3 || 1 h 25 m 57.6 s
|}

1976
The 4º Giro d'Italia automobilistico took place between 17 and 20 October.
The race was part of the Italian Group 4 Championship, Italian Group 5 Championship. A one-make "Trofeo Alfasud" was disputed by 15 Alfa Romeo Alfasud in separate races.

Amongst the notable entrants there were two Lancia-Marlboro Stratos Turbo of Facetti/Sodano and Pinto/Bernacchini, with the "silhouette" body allowed by the newly enacted Special production cars Group 5 rules. Despite looking almost identical, the two cars were very different; Pinto's Stratos used the previous year's carburetted engine, while Facetti's one had an all-new fuel injected and intercooled engine developing about 100 PS more. Fiat sought to replicate its past year's success by entrusting Pinto another prototype 131, this time an unassuming Gr. 4 131 Rally made into a Group 5 car enlarging to 2.1-litre.
Other Group 5 "silhouette" cars were Merzario's Ford Escort, Finotto's BMW-Schnitzer 2002 Turbo and Mannini's Fiat X1/9-based Dallara Icsunonove.

Facetti won with

{|class="wikitable" style="font-size:90%;" width=650px
!width=100px| Day
!width=250px| Leg
!width=200px| Circuit or route
!width=100px| Event
|-
|rowspan=3| 17 October
|rowspan=3| Turin–Monza
| Cesana–Sestriere || Hillclimb
|-
| Autodromo di Casale || Race
|-
| Autodromo di Monza || Race
|-
|rowspan=2| 18 October
|rowspan=2| Monza–Misano || Autodromo di Imola || Race
|-
| Autodromo di Misano || Race
|-
|rowspan=2| 18 October
|rowspan=2| Misano–Parma || S. Stefano–Passo dello Spino || Hillclimb
|-
| Autodromo del Mugello || Race
|-
| 20 October || Parma–Turin || Autodromo di Varano || Race
|-
|colspan=4| Sources:
|}

{| class="wikitable" style="font-size:90%;" width=500px
|- bgcolor="#efefef"
!colspan=5| Podium finishers
|-
!width=5%| Rank
!width=20%| Drivers
!width=45%| TeamCar
!width=10%| Class
!width=20%| Time
|-
|align=center|1
|  || Lancia-Marlboro Lancia Stratos Turbo "Silhouette" ||align=center| Gr. 5 || 2 h 51 m 10.0 s
|-
|align=center|2
|  ||  Porsche 911 RSR ||align=center| || 2 h 57 m 48.1 s
|-
|align=center|3
|  ||  Porsche 911 Turbo ||align=center| || 3 h 01 m 30.6 s
|}

1977
The 5º Giro d'Italia automobilistico took place between 12 and 16 October.

{| class="wikitable" style="font-size:90%;" width=500px
|- bgcolor="#efefef"
!colspan=5| Podium finishers
|-
!width=5%| Rank
!width=25%| Drivers
!width=40%| TeamCar
!width=10%| Class
!width=20%| Time
|-
|align=center|1
|  ||  «Victor» Porsche 935 ||align=center| Gr. 5 ||
|-
|align=center|2
|  ||  Porsche 934 ||align=center| Gr. 4 ||
|-
|align=center|3
|  ||  De Tomaso Pantera ||align=center| Gr. 5 ||
|}

1978
The 6º Giro d'Italia automobilistico took place between 13 and 18 October.
It was one of ten non-World Rally Championship races that counted for the FIA Cup for Rally Drivers. The race was also part of the Italian Group 4 Championship, Italian Group 5 Championship and the one-make "Trofeo Autobianchi A112 Abarth".

Winners were Alén/Pianta/Kivimäki on a works Lancia Stratos; Pianta drove on the track, while the Alén/Kivimäki rally duo tackled the road stages. The car was a modified Group 4 rally car, classed in Group 5 as it was fitted with the 24-valve engine and other components which had lost their FIA homologation that year.
Markku Alén went on to win the FIA Cup for Rally Drivers, also thanks to points scored in the Giro.

{|class="wikitable"  style="font-size:90%;" width=650px
!width=100px| Day
!width=250px| Leg
!width=200px| Circuit or route
!width=100px| Event
|-
|rowspan=2| 14 October
|rowspan=2| Turin–Imola || Autodromo di Monza || Race
|-
| Autodromo di Varano || Race
|-
|rowspan=2| 15 October
|rowspan=2| Imola–Magione || Autodromo Dino Ferrari || Race
|-
| Autodromo di Misano || Race
|-
|rowspan=2| 16 October
|rowspan=2| Magione–Rieti || Rieti–Terminillo || Hillclimb
|-
| Autodromo di Vallelunga || Race
|-
|rowspan=3| 17 October
|rowspan=3| Rieti–Il Ciocco || S. Giorgio–Colonnetta || Hillclimb
|-
| Autodromo di Magione || Race
|-
| S. Stefano–Passo dello Spino || Hillclimb
|-
| 18 October || Il Ciocco–Turin || Ronde del Ciocco || Eight special stages
|}

{| class="wikitable" style="font-size:90%;" width=500px
|- bgcolor="#efefef"
!colspan=5| Podium finishers
|-
!width=5%| Rank
!width=25%| Drivers
!width=40%| TeamCar
!width=10%| Class
!width=20%| Time
|-
|align=center|1
|  ||  Lancia Stratos ||align=center| Gr. 5 || 
|-
|align=center|2
|   ||  Porsche 935 ||align=center| Gr. 5 || 
|-
|align=center|3
|  ||  Lancia Stratos ||align=center| Gr. 4 || 
|}

1979

The two Lancias and other entrants were disqualified, and the first prize went to third-arrived Moretti, Schön and Radaelli privateer trio.

{| class="wikitable" style="font-size:90%;" width=500px
|- bgcolor="#efefef"
!colspan=5| Podium finishers
|-
!width=5%| Rank
!width=25%| Drivers
!width=40%| TeamCar
!width=10%| Class
!width=20%| Time
|-
|style="background-color:red;" align=center|DQ
|  ||  Lancia Lancia Montecarlo Turbo ||align=center| Gr. 5 || 3 h 49 m 46.5 s
|-
|style="background-color:red;" align=center|DQ
|  ||  Lancia-Alitalia Lancia Montecarlo Turbo ||align=center| Gr. 5 || 3 h 50 m 22.3 s
|-
|align=center|1
|  ||  Porsche 935 TT ||align=center| Gr. 5 || 3 h 56 m 34.9 s
|-
|align=center|2
|  ||  Fiat-Alitalia Fiat Ritmo 75 Abarth ||align=center| Gr. 2 || 4 h 7 m 6.3 s
|-
|align=center|3
|  ||  Lancia Stratos ||align=center| Gr. 4 || 4 h 7 m 44.5 s
|}

1980

{| class="wikitable" style="font-size:90%;" width=500px
|- bgcolor="#efefef"
!colspan=5| Podium finishers
|-
!width=5%| Rank
!width=25%| Drivers
!width=40%| TeamCar
!width=10%| Class
!width=20%| Time
|-
|align=center|1
|  ||  Lancia Montecarlo Turbo ||align=center| Gr. 5 || 4 h 25 m 47.1 s
|-
|align=center|2
|  ||  Lancia Montecarlo Turbo ||align=center| Gr. 5 || 4 h 40 m 7.6 s
|-
|align=center|3
|   ||  Porsche 911 SC ||align=center| Gr. 5 || 4 h 43 m 25.2 s
|}

1988
The 9º Giro d'Italia automobilistico took place between 16 and 20 November 1988.

{|class="wikitable"  style="font-size:90%;" width=650px
!width=100px| Day
!width=250px| Leg
!width=200px| Circuit or route
!width=100px| Event
|-
|rowspan=6| 16–17 November
|rowspan=6| Turin–Reggio Emilia || Bollengo || Special stage
|-
| Alba || Special stage
|-
| Varzi || Special stage
|-
| Autodromo di Varano || Race
|-
| Berceto || Special stage
|-
| Ciano d'Enza || Special stage
|-
|rowspan=4| 18 November
|rowspan=4| Reggio Emilia–Misano Adriatico || Prignano || Special stage
|-
| Zocca || Special stage
|-
| Zattaglia || Special stage
|-
| Autodromo di Misano || Race
|-
|rowspan=4| 19 November
|rowspan=4| Misano Adriatico–Parma || Autodromo di Misano || Race
|-
| Vergato || Special stage
|-
| Castagneto || Special stage
|-
| Carpineti || Special stage
|-
|rowspan=2| 20 November
|rowspan=2| Parma–Monza || Autodromo di Monza || Race
|-
| Milan trade fair || Super s. s.
|-
|colspan=4| Source: 
|}

{| class="wikitable" style="font-size:90%;" width=500px
|- bgcolor="#efefef"
!colspan=5| Podium finishers
|-
!width=5%| Rank
!width=25%| Drivers
!width=40%| TeamCar
!width=10%| Class
!width=20%| Time
|-
|align=center|1
|  ||  Alfa Romeo Alfa Romeo 75 Turbo IMSA ||align=center| IMSA || 
|-
|align=center|2
|  ||  Alfa Romeo Alfa Romeo 75 Turbo IMSA ||align=center| IMSA || 2 h 43 m 46 s
|-
|align=center|3
| ||  Alfa Romeo Alfa Romeo 75 Turbo IMSA ||align=center| IMSA || 2 h 44 m 13 s
|}

1989
The 10º Giro d'Italia automobilistico took place between 14 and 19 November 1989.
A poker of Alfa Romeo 75 IMSA took the top positions; the third classified D'Amore/Noberasco/Cianci were privateers.

{|class="wikitable"  style="font-size:90%;" width=650px
!width=100px| Day
!width=250px| Leg
!width=200px| Circuit or route
!width=100px| Event
|-
|rowspan=7| 14–15 November
|rowspan=7| Turin–Castelnuovo Garfagnana || Lingotto || Super s. s.
|-
| Alba || Special stage
|-
| Canelli || Special stage
|-
| Varzi || Special stage
|-
| Autodromo di Varano || Race
|-
| Berceto || Special stage
|-
| Ciocco || Special stage
|-
|rowspan=4| 16 November
|rowspan=4| Castelnuovo Garfagnana–Rome || Ciocco || Special stage
|-
| Poggibonsi || Special stage
|-
| Campiglia d'Orcia || Special stage
|-
| Autodromo di Vallelunga || Race
|-
|rowspan=4| 17 November
|rowspan=4| Rome–Misano Adriatico || Fiano Romano || Special stage
|-
| Deruta || Special stage
|-
| San Giustino || Special stage
|-
| Autodromo di Misano || Race
|-
|rowspan=4| 18 November
|rowspan=4| Misano Adriatico–Reggio Emilia || Autodromo di Misano || Race
|-
| Palazzuolo sul Senio || Special stage
|-
| Vergato || Special stage
|-
| Carpineto || Special stage
|-
| 19 November
| Reggio Emilia–Monza || Autodromo di Monza || Race
|-
|colspan=4| Source: 
|}

{| class="wikitable" style="font-size:90%;" width=500px
|- bgcolor="#efefef"
!colspan=5| Podium finishers
|-
!width=5%| Rank
!width=25%| Drivers
!width=40%| TeamCar
!width=10%| Class
!width=20%| Time
|-
|align=center|1
|  ||  Alfa Romeo Alfa Romeo 75 Turbo IMSA ||align=center| IMSA || 
|-
|align=center|2
|  ||  Alfa Romeo Alfa Romeo 75 Turbo IMSA ||align=center| IMSA || 2 h 53 m 23 s
|-
|align=center|3
|  ||  Alfa Romeo 75 Turbo ||align=center|  || 2 h 54 m 53 s
|}

2011

{|class="wikitable"  style="font-size:90%;" width=650px
!width=100px| Day
!width=250px| Leg
!width=200px| Circuit or route
!width=100px| Event
|-
|rowspan=3| 26 October
|rowspan=3| Turin–Monza || Bielmonte || Special stage
|-
| Pray–Curino || Special stage
|-
| Mottarone || Special stage
|-
|rowspan=3| 27 October
|rowspan=3| Monza–Franciacorta || Autodromo di Monza || Race
|-
| Val Taleggio || Special stage
|-
| Colli San Fermo || Special stage
|-
|rowspan=4| 28 October
|rowspan=4| Franciacorta–Imola || Autodromo di Franciacorta || Race
|-
| Castelli di Canossa || Special stage
|-
| Trinità || Special stage
|-
| Autodromo di Modena || SPS
|-
|rowspan=4| 29 October
|rowspan=4| Imola–Arezzo || Autodromo di Imola || Race
|-
| Monte Faggiola || Special stage
|-
| Autodromo del Mugello || Race
|-
| Talla || Special stage
|-
|rowspan=3| 30 October
|rowspan=3| Arezzo–Vallelunga || Magione || SPS
|-
| Prodo–Colonnetta || Special stage
|-
| Autodromo di Vallelunga || Race
|-
|colspan=4| Source:
|}

{| class="wikitable" style="font-size:90%;" width=500px
|- bgcolor="#efefef"
!colspan=5| Podium finishers
|-
!width=5%| Rank
!width=25%| Drivers
!width=40%| TeamCar
!width=10%| Class
!width=20%| Time
|-
|align=center|1
|  ||  Star Cars Porsche Cayman S CSAI GT4 ||align=center| GTT || 3 h 9 m 8.327 s
|-
|align=center|2
|  ||  Rubicone Corse Lamborghini Gallardo ||align=center| GT || 3 h 10 m 32.053 s
|-
|align=center|3
| ||  PCR Sport SEAT León Supercopa ||align=center| T || 3h 13 m 41.472 s
|}

Overall winners

See also
Tour de France Automobile

References

Sports car races
Auto races in Italy
Historic motorsport events